The flag of Amur Oblast, a federal subject of Russia, was adopted on 16 April 1999. The lower part of the flag (1/3 of the width) is blue in colour and is separated from the upper part by a white serpentine belt, reminiscent of a river wave. The width of the belt is 1/15 the width of the flag. The upper part of the flag is red, symbolizing the rich history of the Amur region. The ratio of the flag is 2:3.

References
Flags of the World

Flag of Amur Oblast
Flags of the federal subjects of Russia
Amur
Flags of Russia